The Rally for the Republic (RPR ), was a Gaullist and conservative political party in France. Originating from the Union of Democrats for the Republic (UDR), it was founded by Jacques Chirac in 1976 and presented itself as the heir of Gaullist politics. On 21 September 2002, the RPR was merged into the Union for the Presidential Majority, later renamed the Union for a Popular Movement (UMP).

History

The defense of the Gaullist identity against President Giscard d'Estaing (1976–1981)

In 1974, the divisions in the Gaullist movement permitted the election of Valéry Giscard d'Estaing to the Presidency of the French Republic. Representing the pro-European and Orleanist centre-right, he was the first non-Gaullist becoming head of state since the beginning of the Fifth Republic in 1958. However, the Gaullist Party remained the main force in parliament and Jacques Chirac was appointed Prime Minister. Chirac resigned in August 1976 and in December 1976 the RPR was created in order to restore the Gaullist domination over the institutions of the French republic.

Though retaining its support for the president's government, the RPR criticized the executive duo composed of President Giscard d'Estaing and Prime Minister Raymond Barre. Its first master stroke was in March 1977 the election of Chirac as Mayor of Paris against Michel d'Ornano, a close friend of President Giscard d'Estaing. Nevertheless, it was faced with the creation of the Union for French Democracy (UDF), a confederation of the parties supporting the presidential policies and which competed for the leadership over the right. Consequently, the stake of the 1978 legislative election was not only the victory of the right over the left, but the domination of the RPR over the UDF in the parliamentary majority.

Given the increasing unpopularity of the executive duo, and with a view to the next presidential election, the RPR became increasingly critical. In December 1978, six months before the European Parliament election, the Call of Cochin signed by Chirac denounced the appropriation of France by "the foreign party," which sacrificed the national interests and the independence of the country in order to build a federal Europe. This accusation clearly targeted Giscard d'Estaing. RPR leaders contrasted this as coming from the social doctrine of Gaullism as opposed to a perceived liberalism on the part of the President.

As RPR candidate at the 1981 presidential election, Chirac formulated vigorous condemnations of President Giscard d'Estaing, who ran for a second term. Eliminated in the first round, Chirac refused to give an endorsement for the second round, though he did say privately that he would vote for Giscard d'Estaing. In fact, the RPR was expected to work for the defeat of the incumbent president.

The opposition to President Mitterrand and the abandonment of the Gaullist doctrine (1981–1995)

After 1981, the RPR opposed with energy the policy of the Socialist Party President François Mitterrand and the left-wing governments. The RPR denounced the plan of nationalizations as the setting up of a "collectivist society". Impressed by the electoral success of New Right conservatives led by Ronald Reagan in the United States of America and by Margaret Thatcher in the United Kingdom, it gradually abandoned the Gaullist doctrine, claiming less control of the state in the economy. During its 1983 congress, it advocated a liberal economic programme and the pursuit of the European construction, accepting the supranationality.

This new political line contributed to the reconciliation between the RPR and the UDF. In this, they presented a common list at the 1984 European Parliament election and a platform to prepare the winning 1986 legislative election. However, a rivalry appeared between Jacques Chirac and Raymond Barre who competed for the right-wing leadership with a view to the next presidential election. Furthermore, if the right-wing coalition benefited from the failures of the Socialist power, it was confronted with the emergence of the National Front in the far right. The RPR was divided about the possibility of alliance with this party.

In 1986, being the leader of the main party of the new parliamentary majority and accepting the principle of the "cohabitation" with President Mitterrand (contrary to Barre), Chirac became again Prime Minister. He led a liberal economic policy inspired by Anglo-Saxon examples, selling many public companies, and abolishing the wealth tax. His Interior Minister Charles Pasqua led a policy of restriction of immigration. If Chirac acceded in the second round of the 1988 presidential election despite Raymond Barre's candidacy, he was defeated by Mitterrand.

While the RPR returned in the opposition, the leadership of Chirac was challenged by younger politicians who wished to renew the right. Furthermore, the abandonment of the Gaullist doctrine was criticized by Charles Pasqua and Philippe Séguin. They tried to take him the RPR lead in 1990, in vain. However, the division re-appeared with the 1992 Maastricht referendum. Chirac voted "yes" whereas Séguin and Pasqua campaigned for "no".

The "Union for France", a RPR/UDF coalition, won the 1993 legislative election. Chirac refused to re-cohabitate with Mitterrand, and Edouard Balladur became prime minister. Balladur promised that he would not be a candidate at the 1995 presidential election. Nevertheless, polls indicated Balladur was the favorite in the presidential race and, furthermore, he was supported by the most part of the right-wing politicians. He decided finally to run against Chirac. However, they claimed that they remained friends for 30 years.

The Socialists being weakened after the 14 years of Mitterrand's presidency, the main competition was within the right, between Balladur and Chirac, two Neo-Gaullists. Balladur proposed a liberal program and took advantage of the "positive results" of his cabinet, whereas Chirac advocated Keynesian economics to reduce the "social fracture" and criticized the "dominant ideas", targeting Balladur. Chirac won the 1995 presidential election.

The RPR became the presidential party (1995–2002)

After his election as President of France, Jacques Chirac nominated Alain Juppé, "the best among us" according to him, as Prime Minister. But the majority of the personalities who had supported Balladur during the presidential campaign were excluded from the government. The balladuriens (such as Nicolas Sarkozy) were completely isolated in the party too.

In November 1995, Prime Minister Alain Juppé announced a plan to reform the French welfare state which sparked wide social conflict. The executive duo became very unpopular and some months later President Chirac dissolved the National Assembly. His supporters lost the 1997 legislative election. Consequently, he was forced to cohabitate with a left-wing cabinet led by Lionel Jospin until 2002.

Séguin succeeded to Juppé as RPR leader, but he criticized the ascendancy of President Chirac over the party. He resigned during the 1999 European campaign while Pasqua presented a dissident list to advocate the Gaullist idea of a "Europe of nations". Pasqua founded the Rally for France (RPF) and obtained more votes than the RPR official list led by Nicolas Sarkozy. Michèle Alliot-Marie, former Minister of Youth and sports, was elected RPR leader, against the will of President Chirac who supported covertly an unfamous candidate Jean-Paul Delevoye. Besides, the RPR was involved in many financing scandals. For instance, the party was suspected to pay its employees with the funds of Paris's municipality. The RPR lost the mayoralty of Paris in 2001, in aid of the left.

After the 1999 European elections, the RPR joined the European People's Party–European Democrats (EPP-ED) parliamentary group, and became a full member of the European People's Party (EPP) in December 2001.

Before the 2002 presidential election, both RPR and non-RPR supporters of Chirac gathered in an association: the "Union on the move". It became the Union for a Popular Movement (UMP) after the 21 April 2002 electoral shock. Chirac was re-elected and the new party won the legislative election.

Prior to its replacement by the UMP, the RPR had been increasingly embroiled in judicial proceedings following from the corruption scandals in the Paris region. Its former secretary-general Alain Juppé was sentenced in 2004 for a related felony. In 2007, a formal judicial investigation was opened against Jacques Chirac himself.

Election results

Presidential

National Assembly

European Parliament

Past presidents 
Jacques Chirac, 1976–1994
Alain Juppé, 1994–1997
Philippe Séguin, 1997–1999
Nicolas Sarkozy, 1999 (interim)
Michèle Alliot-Marie, 1999–2002
Serge Lepeltier, 2002 (interim)

RPR Assembly Groups
1978–1981: 154 members including 11 caucusing (out of 491)
1981–1986: 88 members including 9 caucusing (out of 491)
1986–1988: 155 members including 8 caucusing (out of 577)
1988–1993: 130 members including 3 caucusing (out of 577)
1993–1997: 257 members including 12 caucusing (out of 577).
1997–2002: 140 members including 6 caucusing (out of 577)

See also

 Gaullist Party
 Politics of France

References

External links
 Unofficial history and description
 Unofficial timeline

 
Gaullist parties
Conservative parties in France